The Grampians is an economic rural region located in the western part of Victoria, Australia. The  region lies to the northwest of the western suburbs of Greater Melbourne, to the state's western border with South Australia and includes the Grampians National Park and significant gold mining heritage assets. The Grampians region has two sub-regions, Grampians Central Highlands and Wimmera Southern Mallee.

Administration

Political representation 
For the purposes of Australian federal elections for the House of Representatives, the Grampians region is contained within all or part of the electoral divisions of Ballarat, Corangamite, Mallee, and Wannon.

For the purposes of Victorian elections for the Legislative Assembly, the Grampians region is contained within all or part of the electoral districts of Buninyong, Lowan, Melton, Mildura, Murray Plains, Polwarth, Ripon and Wendouree.

Local government areas 
The region contains eleven local government areas, which are:

Food and Wine Festival
The Grampians Region is home to one of Australia's longest running food and wine festivals, Grampians Grape Escape, held over the first weekend of May in Halls Gap every year.  Launched in 1992, the Grampians Grape Escape is a hallmark event for Victoria and provides food and wine offerings by more than 100 local artisan producers, live music and family entertainment.

Environmental protection 
The Grampians region contains the Grampians National Park and Little Desert National Park.

Notes

References